Shizunai Stallion Station is a Japanese Thoroughbred horse farm was opened in 1963 and is located on the island of  Hokkaidō. Operated by the Japan Bloodhorse Breeders' Association (JBBA), it is located in Shizunai whose sister city is Lexington, Kentucky. Shizunai Stallion Station stables 15 stallions and plays a central role in the stallion operations of JBBA.

The site features a clinic, an insemination facility, paddocks, stables, a research centre and an indoor riding arena. In 2006 an export quarantine facility was established to hold Japanese-bred horses in quarantine before they are exported to Australasia, Malaysia, Singapore and Hong Kong.

It is the current home of some very famous Thoroughbred stallions from around the world including:

 Boston Harbor (USA)
 Came Home (USA) 
 Stravinsky (USA) 
 Cape Blanco (USA)
 Bago (FR)
 Alamshar (IRE)
 Johannesburg (USA) 
 Eskendereya (USA)
 Creator (USA)

Other notable horses who have stood at Shizunai Stallion Station includes-

 Pilsudski (GB), moved to Ireland in 2004. 
 Coronado's Quest (USA), died in 2006. 
 Dancing Brave (USA), died in 1999. 
 Silver Charm (USA), returned to the U.S. in 2014. 
 Tabasco Cat (USA), died in 2004. 
 Empire Maker (USA), returned to the U.S. in 2016
 Chief Bearhart (CAN), died in 2012.
 David Junior (USA), moved to the Iburi Stallion Station in 2010. 
 Forty Niner (USA), was pensioned in 2007.
 Silent Hunter (JPN), died in 2014. 
 Opera House (GB), pensioned in 2013. 
 Charismatic (USA), pensioned and returned to the U.S. in 2016. 
 King Glorious (USA), pensioned in 2010 and died in 2016.

See also 
 Other JBBA Stallion Stations
 Iburi Stallion Station (Iburi, Hokkaido)
 Shichinohe Stallion Station (Shichinohe, Aomori)
 Nasu Stallion Station (Nasu, Tochigi)
 Kyūshū Stallion Station (Kagoshima, Kyūshū)

References 

 JBBA 2008 Stallion Roster
 Tabasco Cat

Horse farms
Farms in Japan
Japanese racehorse owners and breeders